Cheung Sha Wan Plaza is shopping mall and office complex in Cheung Sha Wan, Kowloon, Hong Kong. It was developed by Lai Sun Development in 1989. It is erected over MTR Lai Chi Kok station, consisting of a bus terminus, multi-storey car parks, a commercial/retail podium and two office towers.

References

Shopping malls established in 1989
1989 establishments in Hong Kong
Cheung Sha Wan
Shopping centres in Hong Kong
Lai Sun Group